is a private, women's college located in Izumi-ku, Sendai, Miyagi Prefecture Japan. The school is affiliated with the Roman Catholic Church.

History
The Sisters of Charity of St. Paul from France established a school of women (Sendai Jogakkou) in 1893. This school received official recognition in 1907. It was officially chartered as Sendai Shirayuri  Junior College in 1966 and as a four-year college in 1996. The junior college was abolished in April 2003.

Organization
 Faculty of Humanities
Department of Human Development
Department of Nursery Education
Department of Mental Welfare and Psychology
Department of Health and Nutrition
Global Studies Department

External links

 Official website 

Educational institutions established in 1893
Private universities and colleges in Japan
Universities and colleges in Miyagi Prefecture
1893 establishments in Japan
Women's universities and colleges in Japan
Catholic universities and colleges in Japan
Buildings and structures in Sendai